Comet White–Ortiz–Bolelli (formal designations: C/1970 K1, 1970 VI, and 1970f) was a bright comet which appeared in 1970. It was a member of the Kreutz Sungrazers, a family of comets which resulted from the break-up of a large parent comet several centuries ago. It was already easily visible to the naked eye when first discovered, and reached a maximum apparent magnitude of +1.

Discovery 
Comet White–Ortiz–Bolelli was first spotted on May 16 by Albert and Ronald Snelgar on May 16 in Halls Creek WA, and then into the NT on successive nights. They advised the discovery to Halls Creek police (who disregarded the discovery). It was then officially discovered on May 18 by Graeme White, an Australian amateur astronomer in Wollongong, New South Wales. He sighted the comet in binoculars shortly after sunset, and described it as having a star-like head at apparent magnitude 1-2, and a short tail about 1 degree long. He spotted it again on May 20 by naked eye as well as binoculars, and by this time the tail had grown to 10° in length.

The second independent discovery was made on May 21 by Air France pilot Emilio Ortiz, from a location about 400 km east of Madagascar. Ortiz saw the comet from his cockpit, and reported a magnitude of 0.5 to 1.0 and a tail about 5–8° long. A few hours later, Carlos Bolelli, a technician at the Cerro Tololo Inter-American Observatory in Chile became the third independent discoverer of the comet, although he saw only the tail, as the head was beneath the horizon.

Subsequent observations 
Numerous independent discoveries were made in the days immediately following the comet's discovery, but astronomical naming conventions only allowed the comet to be given the names of the first three. All sightings of the comet were made from the southern hemisphere, due to the orientation of its orbit with respect to the Earth.

Throughout the comet's brief appearance, it could only be seen low in the sky for a short time after sunset, but it was most easily visible on May 24. After that it faded rapidly, and by 1 June it had already faded to below naked-eye visibility. The last definite detection of the comet was made on June 7, when it appeared as a faint, ill-defined nebulosity. Increasing moonlight and the comet's decreasing brightness prevented any further visual sightings of the comet.

A sungrazer 
The comet's sudden appearance very close to the Sun and rapid subsequent decline in brightness both pointed to it being a sungrazing comet, and calculations of its orbit by Brian G. Marsden backed this suggestion. Marsden showed that the comet had reached perihelion on May 14, at a distance of just 1.35 million km, or 2 solar radii.

The calculated orbit pinned down White-Ortiz-Bolelli as a member of the Kreutz Sungrazers, a group of comets which all originate from the fragmentation of one giant parent comet several hundred years ago, and which has provided some of the brightest comets ever seen. Kreutz Sungrazers all travel on similar orbits, which result in them being most easily visible from the southern hemisphere, between August and April. Kreutz sungrazers appearing between May and July may come and go unseen, as they approach from directly behind the Sun as seen from Earth; the only previous Kreutz Sungrazer seen during these months was the Eclipse Comet of 1882, which was only observed once, during a total solar eclipse.

Before White–Ortiz–Bolelli, studies had divided the Kreutz Sungrazers into two sub-groups, originating from fragmentations at different orbits, but White-Ortiz-Bolelli seemed to be a member of neither. Studies showed that it probably broke away from the comet that spawned Subgroup II, before the main fragmentation, and it was classed as the first (and so far only) member of Subgroup IIa.

Having an observation arc of only 14 days with a likely assumed near perihelion orbital eccentricity of 1.0 (epoch 1970-May-14), it is unknown if this parabolic comet will be ejected from the Solar System.

References 

 Roemer E. (1970), Comet Notes, Publications of the Astronomical Society of the Pacific, v. 82, p. 928

External links 
 https://web.archive.org/web/20050302071933/http://cometography.com/lcomets/1970k1.html

Non-periodic comets
Kreutz Sungrazers
Astronomical objects discovered in 1970
Discoveries by amateur astronomers